The New York State College of Ceramics at Alfred University (NYSCC) is a statutory college of the State University of New York located on the campus of Alfred University, Alfred, New York. There are a total of 616 students, including 536 undergraduates and 80 graduates.

History
The college was founded by an Act, signed into law on April 11, 1900 by Governor Theodore Roosevelt, per Chapter 383 of the Session Laws of New York, 1900 establishing the New York State School of Clay-Working and Ceramics. This move by Alfred University to petition the New York State legislature in 1899 followed a period of crisis at the University starting in 1895, which was facing low enrollments, mounting deficits, and the recent resignation of then President A.E. Main (1893-95). The Trustees, with support from area businesses and alumni recognized the trends in higher education toward applied sciences and technology, supporting the decision to petition the legislature.   

Charles Fergus Binns, a British ceramist, served as the first Director of the school, after completing a career at Royal Worcester Porcelain Works.  In 1932 it was renamed as the New York State College of Ceramics (NYSCC) with two departments, General Technology and Engineering and Applied Art. The College is presently composed of the School of Art and Design, the Inamori School of Engineering and the Samuel R. Scholes Library. The College also houses the Inamori Museum of Fine Ceramics, one of two such collections globally, focused on technical ceramics and glass.

The Inamori School of Engineering at Alfred University offers programs in ceramics, glass, biomaterials, and materials science engineering.  In addition, the programs in mechanical engineering and renewable energy engineering are offered through Alfred University, the private institution the NYSCC is affiliated with. The School of Engineering is one of only two institutions in the U.S. that offers a B.S. in Ceramic Engineering, and the only institution in the U.S. that offers degrees in glass science.

Notable alumni

Margaret Boozer
Cristina Córdova
R. Guy Cowan
Karon Doherty
Julia Galloway
Maija Grotell
Isaac Scott Hathaway
Steve Heinemann
Vivika Heino
Ayumi Horie
Packard Jennings
Michael Lax
Tony Marsh
Walter McConnell
Ruth Gowdy McKinley, first potter elected to Royal Canadian Academy of Art
Rebekah Modrak
Judy Moonelis
William O'Connor
Ken Price
Daniel Rhodes
Norm Schulman
Robert Chapman Turner
Betty Woodman
Arnold Zimmerman

Notable faculty

Charles Fergus Binns
Daniel Rhodes
Robert Chapman Turner
Walter McConnell
Wayne Higby
Andrew Deutsch
Paul DeMarinis
Heather Mae Erickson
William Underhill

References

External links

Ceramics
Ceramics
Art schools in New York (state)
Culture of New York City
Design schools in the United States
American pottery
Universities and colleges in Allegany County, New York
Ceramics